The Lost World (officially Sir Arthur Conan Doyle's The Lost World) is a syndicated television series loosely based on the 1912 novel by Sir Arthur Conan Doyle, The Lost World. The show premiered in the United States in the fall of 1999 (after the TV-movie/pilot aired in February on DirecTV and then on the cable television channel TNT in April). It ran for three seasons, the final two of which aired in syndication in the United States, before it was cancelled in 2002 after funding for a fourth season fell through. The final episode ended with an unresolved cliffhanger. All three seasons were released in DVD box sets in 2004.

Plot
"At the dawn of the 20th century" a band of British adventurers, led by adventurer and scholar Professor George Challenger, embark on an expedition to prove the existence of an isolated lost world. The group,  some mismatched enthusiasts with less than selfless reasons for making the journey, consists of Challenger, Professor Arthur Summerlee, Marguerite Krux, Major Lord John Richard Roxton and Edward T. Malone.

Their hot air balloon crashes in the Amazon rainforest on an uncharted plateau where prehistoric creatures survive. The group is assisted by a young jungle-savvy woman named Veronica Layton, whose parents disappeared eleven years before. Her family was part of a research group known to have vanished under mysterious circumstances. Together, the group fights to survive against carnivorous dinosaurs, vicious Neanderthals, a race of lizard men, and other perils as they search for a way to escape. Each episode detailed two separate, simultaneous adventures.

The later series established that the party became stranded in 1919.

Episodes

Proposed season 4
The final episode of the third season ended with an unresolved cliffhanger.

The producers of the show have revealed some details of the proposed fourth and even fifth seasons from 2002. If the subsequent season had been produced, fans would have learned that Professor Arthur Summerlee was indeed alive, residing in Avalon. Avalon, near the border of the Plateau, is where Veronica's surviving mother Abigail Layton had become the Plateau's protector soon after her disappearance. She became the ruler of Avalon and had left behind a triangle artifact - the Trion, the Eye of Heaven - for her daughter Veronica to find. Veronica was to become the new Protector of the Plateau, standing  in opposition to the line of Mordren, whose descendents intend to use the Plateau's power for evil.  Her tree-house dwelling was apparently the epicenter of the entire Plateau.

The new season would have also revealed that Marguerite and Roxton were always meant to be together from the beginning. As Veronica is the new Protector of the Plateau, Marguerite is a descendant of Morrighan, a druid priestess who once served as  "third power" within the Trion forces between the Protectors and the line of Mordren. As with her ancestor, Marguerite would have been a free will agent allowed to choose good or evil in the battle against power over the Plateau.  Roxton, Marguerite's knight, protector, and future groom, would have been her personal guide so that Marguerite would ultimately choose "good." Because Morrighan's line descends from a child born to a Protector and the line of Mordren and Veronica's bloodline is of the Protectors, Veronica and Marguerite are cousins genetically, but spiritually are sisters. Roxton's role as Marguerite's modern day knight originates with his childhood and ancestral home having close proximity to Avebury, nearly twenty miles from Stonehenge. Finn would have been revealed to be Malone's great-great-granddaughter, her grandmother being the Amazon Phoebe (also played by Lara Cox) whom Malone had sex with in the episode "Amazons".  The series would have been resolved with Malone and Veronica together as a couple and staying in Avalon, while Challenger uses his teleportation invention from the episode "Finn" to send himself, Roxton, Marguerite, and Summerlee to London, but travels forward in time to the year 2005 where they are warmly greeted by the zoological society due to Malone having sent them a letter explaining when they would arrive. 

The fourth season would have featured guest appearances of two other Arthur Conan Doyle characters, Sherlock Holmes and Professor James Moriarty.

Characters

Overview

Notes

Main
 Professor George Edward Challenger (portrayed by Peter McCauley) — A scholar, visionary, and adventurer who is the leader of the expedition. He hopes to prove his claims to the skeptical London Zoological Society.
 Marguerite Krux (portrayed by Rachel Blakely) — The selfish financier of the expedition and heiress to a fortune who goes along for her own reasons.
 Lord John Richard Roxton (portrayed by William Snow) — The nobleman with vast hunting experience, who accidentally killed his brother while trying to save him from an ape. He serves as protector of the group.
 Edward "Ned" T. Malone (portrayed by David Orth) — An American newspaper reporter, who joins the expedition hoping to make a name for himself.
 Veronica Layton (portrayed by Jennifer O'Dell) – A jungle girl whose parents disappeared eleven years prior to the series.
 Professor Arthur Summerlee (portrayed by Michael Sinelnikoff) — A scientist, and a colleague to George Challenger, who initially does not believe Challenger's claims about a lost world.
 Finn (portrayed by Lara Cox) – A young woman from the year 2033 who debuted in season 3. She joins the explorers in the past in hopes of preventing the post-apocalyptic future she lived in.

Supporting

 Assai (portrayed by Laura Vazquez) - The daughter of Jacoba, the leader of the Zanga Indian tribe. She is a childhood friend of Veronica.
 Tribune (portrayed by Jerome Ehlers) - The leader of a tribe of lizard men. He had different encounters with Challenger's group and has developed some respect for them.
 William Maple White (Robert Coleby) - A scientist whose initial exploration of the plateau instigates Challenger to launch his own expedition of the plateau to obtain proof of the prehistoric creatures.

Plateau animals
There are various prehistoric animals and other species of creatures that live on the plateau, including:

 Ankylosaurus - Ankylosaurus appears in "Cave of Fear", "Blood Lust" and "Paradise Found".
 Brontosaurus
 Giant Bee
 Dimetrodon - seen only as a mural in the Prophecy'.
 Dilophosaurus - Dilophosaurus appears in 'Blood Lust', 'Out of Time', 'The Beast Within', 'Absolute Power', 'Time After Time', 'Prodigal Father' and 'The Chosen One'. 
 Pachycephalosaurus - This was only seen on the book page in the original launch.
 Parasaurolophus
 Plesiosaurus
 Pteranodon
 Smilodon - Smilodon would have originally appeared as a recurring animal, but was cut from the completed program.
 Stegosaurus - seen only as a mural in the episode 'Prophecy'.
 Triceratops
 Tyrannosaurus - Tyrannosaurus are recurring predators in the series, where everyone tries unsuccessfully to catch and eat the main characters.
 Velociraptor - Velociraptors are recurring predators in the series, where they are to devour the main characters but always fail.

Broadcast
The first part of the series originally aired on Pay-per-view via DirecTV in the summer of 1999 before it aired in syndication. The original airing was uncensored, containing nudity and extended scenes. The syndicated version on TV and DVD releases are edited.

Following the limited run on PPV, the first broadcast TV run of the series ran weekly in syndication on hundreds of stations in the United States, including the WB 100+ group stations, a joint Time Warner and Tribune Broadcasting entity. Because of syndex rules each episode aired one week later on WGN America, and on the Space TV network in Canada. The series continued to be rerun in daily strip form in the United States on the Time Warner owned TNT in the early morning hours Monday through Friday.

International
In addition to the English language broadcasts in North America and Europe, the series has aired around the globe in other languages. The series aired in Europe on the SciFi Channel Europe. The series was also dubbed in Bengali in Bangladesh and was subsequently aired on ATN Bangla in 2009.

During the original run the weekly syndicated primary and backup satellite wildfeed for the series utilized the Galaxy 26 satellite located at 93° West longitude. As of 2022 the series is airing on South African channel SABC 3 on weekdays at around 01:00 in the early hours of the morning.

DVD releases
The series was removed from the schedule after the DVD release in the United States after a third Time Warner company, New Line Television, sold the DVD region 1 distribution rights to Image Entertainment.
The DVD region 2 distribution rights were sold to Liberation Entertainment.

Image Entertainment released all three seasons of The Lost World on DVD in Region 1 in NTSC. Liberation Entertainment released all three seasons on DVD in Region 2 in PAL.

The original 93 minute version pilot movie was released on DVD in 4:3 PAL under the title, The Lost World The Beginning by ILC Prime licensed by Fremantle Corporation.

Note: The pilot television movie was edited down into episodes 1 "The Journey Begins" & episode 2 "Stranded" for the TV series.

References

External links

The Lost World Fan Forum
Plot Summary Season 4 + 5 with Conclusion of Season 3 Cliffhanger

1990s American science fiction television series
2000s American science fiction television series
1999 American television series debuts
2002 American television series endings
1990s Canadian science fiction television series
2000s Canadian science fiction television series
1999 Canadian television series debuts
2002 Canadian television series endings
1999 Australian television series debuts
2002 Australian television series endings
Canadian fantasy television series
Professor Challenger
Television series by Warner Bros. Television Studios
TNT (American TV network) original programming
First-run syndicated television programs in the United States
First-run syndicated television shows in Canada
Television shows based on British novels
Television shows set in South America
Television series about dinosaurs
Television series by New Line Television
Fiction about neanderthals
Australian science fiction television series
Canadian action adventure television series
Lost world television series
Television series set in the 1920s
Television series set in 1919
Television series set in the 1910s